Łupki may refer to the following places in Poland:
Łupki, Lower Silesian Voivodeship (south-west Poland)
Łupki, Warmian-Masurian Voivodeship (north Poland)